Robert Tracy may refer to:
 Robert Tracy, 2nd Viscount Tracy (1593–1662), English politician
 Robert Tracy (judge) (1655–1735), English judge
 Robert Emmet Tracy (1909–1980), American prelate of the Roman Catholic Church
 Robert Tracy (dancer) (1955–2007), American dancer, writer, and educator
 Robert Tracy (MP) (died 1767), English member of parliament
 Robert J. Tracy, American law enforcement officer

See also
 Bob Tracy, former American football coach